Club Deportivo Balonmano Aula Cultural, also known as Aula Alimentos de Valladolid, is a Spanish women's handball club from Valladolid in División de Honor since 2013.

Season to season

Team

Current squad
Squad for the 2022-2023 season

Goalkeepers
 12  Carmen Sanz Ledo
 16  Alicia Robles
 1  Laura Garnacho
Wingers
RW
 8  Inoa Lucio
 13  Cati Benedetti
LW
 6  Lydia Blanco
 77  Amaia González de Garibay
Line players
 41  Savina Bergara
 19  Irene Botella
 36  Marcela Arounian

Back players
LB
 3  Jimena Laguna
 5  Fiorella Corimberto
 ?  Martina Romero
CB
 21  Teresa Álvarez Ruiz
 2  Elba Álvarez
RB
 10  María Prieto O'Mullony
 18  Lorena Téllez
 29  Laura Bazco

Transfers
''Transfers for the 2023-2024

Joining

Leaving
  Irene Botella (LP) ?
  Laura Bazco (RB) ?
  Fiorella Corimberto (LB) ?

Notable players
  Silvia Arderíus
  Elisabet Cesáreo
  Alicia Fernández
  Amaia González de Garibay

References

External links

Spanish handball clubs
Sport in Valladolid
Handball clubs established in 1986
Sports teams in Castile and León